Sportforum Hohenschönhausen is a multi-purpose sports complex in the locality of Alt-Hohenschönhausen of the borough of Lichtenberg in Berlin. The Sportforum was named Dynamo-Sportforum during the East German era.

Sportforum Hohenschönhausen covers an area between 45 and 50 hectares, and comprises 35 sports facilities, including three ice rinks, two athletics halls, a football stadium, as well as eight other halls and open spaces for various sports.  Development of the Dynamo-Sportforum began in 1954. The original building ensemble, including the Dynamo-Sporthalle, which was built in individual sections from 1955, based on designs by an architectural collective led by Walter Schmidt, is a protected building of cultural heritage. Expansion of the Sportforum continued into the 1980s. The complex is the second largest sports complex in Berlin after the Olympiapark.

The Dynamo-Sportforum was the training center where the top athletes and future Olympic medalists trained during the East German era. It was the headquarter of sports association SV Dynamo and home to sports club SC Dynamo Berlin. The Olympic Training Center Berlin (OSP Berlin) is now the main user of the facilities. Around 20 sports clubs are also based in the Sportforum and more than 3,000 athletes use the facilities every day.

Location
The Sportforum Hohenschönhausen is located in the western part of the locality of Alt-Hohenschönhausen of the borough of Lichtenberg in Berlin. It is bordered on the north by an industrial area (on which, among other establishments, the Berliner-Kindl-Schultheiss-Brauerei is located), on the east by the St. Andrew and St. Mark's Cemetery, on the south by the Konrad-Wolf-Straße and on the west by the Weißenseer Weg.

Facilities

The Sportforum Hohenschönhausen covers an area between 45 and 50 hectares, and comprises 35 sports facilities, including three ice rinks, two athletics halls, a football stadium, as well as eight other halls and open spaces for athletics, swimming, handball, volleyball, judo, fencing, archery, beach volleyball and football. The Sportforum is the second largest sports complex in Berlin after the Olympiapark.

Development of the Dynamo-Sportforum began in 1954. The original building ensemble was built in individual sections from 1955, based on designs by an architectural collective led by Walter Schmidt, which had emerged as the winner of an architectural competition held in 1953. The construction was carried out by the state-owned company VEB Industriebau Berlin for the Ministry of the Interior and the Ministry for State Security of East Germany. The Sportforum was expanded according to requirements by the adding of additional facilities and expansion continued into the 1980s.

The original building ensemble built from 1955 to 1959 is now a protected building of cultural importance. The facilities includes artworks such as mosaic artwork by Wolfgang Frankenstein in the foyer of the Dynamo-Sporthalle and the swimming hall, the copper artwork "Sport-Fries" by Wolfgang Frankenstein on the facade of the athletics hall towards the Konrad-Wolf-Straße and the two bronze sculptures "Seated Swimmer" by Gustav Weidanz and "Standing Swimmer" by Waldemar Grzimek at the outdoor swimming pool.

Use of the site
The Dynamo-Sportforum was built as a training center for elite sport. It was used by the top athletes and future Olympic medalists of East Germany. The sports club SC Dynamo Berlin, with its many sports, disciplines and squads, was the main user of the first ten facilities. The Central Management Office (BdZL) of SV Dynamo also had its offices in the Dynamo-Sportforum.

The Olympic Training Center Berlin (OSP Berlin) has used the Sportform since the beginning of the 1990s and is now the main user of the facilities. More than 300 national team athletes regularly train in the facility. The Olympic Training Center Berlin (OSP Berlin) is the largest Olympic training center in Germany.

The Sportforum is also home to eleven state training centres with around 800 state team athletes, the location for the School and High-Performance Sports Center Berlin (SLZB) (formerly known as the elite Children and Youth Sports School (KJS) ”Werner Seelenbinder”), the "House of Athletes" with around 200 boarding school places, and the Institute for Sports Science of the Humboldt University of Berlin, with approximately 500 students. Around 20 sports clubs as based in the Sportforum and more than 3,000 athletes use the facilities every day.

The main users among the sports clubs based in the Sportforum are SC Berlin, Berliner TSC, BFC Dynamo, Eisbären Berlin junior teams and Alba Berlin junior teams. Other users are Füchse Berlin, SSG Humboldt zu Berlin, SC Charlottenburg and SV Preußen Berlin.

Ice sports arenas

The Wellblechpalast opened on the sports complex in 1963. It was the home arena of the ice hockey department of SC Dynamo Berlin, and served as the home arena of its continuation, the Eisbären Berlin, until 2008. The arena has a seating capacity for 4,695 people. The arena is still used as a training facility by the professional team of Eisbären Berlin and is the home arena of the youth teams of Eisbären Berlin.

A 400 m speed skating indoor arena opened on 17 November 1986, and was the first covered speed skating oval in the world, one day prior to Thialf in Heerenveen which hosted the World Allround Speed Skating Championships for Men later that season.

Speed skating track records
500 m (m): 34.85; Jeremy Wotherspoon, 14 March 2003
500 m (w): 37.52; Jenny Wolf, 6 November 2009
1000 m (m): 1:08.53; Shani Davis, 6 November 2009
1000 m (w): 1:15.04; Christine Nesbitt, 11 March 2012
1500 m (m): 1:44.47; Shani Davis, 8 November 2009
1500 m (w): 1:54:88; Jorien ter Mors, 8 December 2013
3000 m (m): 3:46.17; Håvard Bøkko, 25 October 2008
3000 m (w): 4:00.75; Martina Sáblíková, 6 November 2009
5000 m (m): 6:09.76; Sven Kramer, 17 November 2006
5000 m (w): 6:59.26; Martina Sáblíková, 10 February 2008
10000 m (m): 13:09.06; Sven Kramer, 10 February 2008
Team pursuit (m): 3:40.79; Netherlands, 19 November 2006
Team pursuit (w): 3:01.03; Canada, 11 March 2012

Football stadium

Dynamo-Stadion im Sportforum in the East German era (1954–1989) 
A sports field on the site of the football stadium existed already in the 1920s. The sports field was known as the Sportplatz Steffenstraße. The current football stadium was then constructed in 1954. The stadium was built with the help of the National Construction Work (NAW) (de).

SC Dynamo Berlin played the 1954-55 season at the Walter-Ulbricht-Stadion in Mitte. The team moved its home matches to the football stadium in the Dynamo-Sportforum for the short transitional 1955 season. The stadium was also called Stadion Steffenstraße at this time. The capacity of the stadium was 8,000 spectators during the 1955 season. SC Dynamo Berlin functionary Günther Purrmann praised the Dynamo-Sportform, as it offered all facilites for training, such as good changing rooms, a small canteen and a bright room for theory lessions. But above all, the  football stadium offered better contact with the crowd, compared to the very large Walter-Ulbricht-Stadion. Nevertheless, SC Dynamo Berlin returned to the Walter-Ulbricht-Stadion for the 1956 season.

SC Dynamo Berlin moved permanentely to the Dynamo-Sportforum after the construction of the Berlin wall began on 13 August 1961. The team played its first match at the football stadium in the Dynamo-Sportforum during the 1961-62 season against BSG Motor Zwickau in the 16th matchday of the 1961-62 DDR-Oberliga on 13 September 1961. The stadium had been expanded since the 1955 season and had a capacity of 10,000 spectators at the start of the 1961-62 season. 

The Dynamo-Sportforum was still on the outskirts of Berlin in the early 1960s. The sports complex was surrounded by thousands of small gardens. Hohenschönhausen was primarily known as an excursion destination among Berliners. There was only one tram connection to the Dynamo-Sportforum and the transport options to the stadium had been poor during the 1955 season. The Dynamo-Stadion im Sportforum was now freshly spruced up for the first match of SC Dynamo Berlin at the stadium at the start of the 1961-62 season. The stadium was repainted and flowers were planted all around. Transport connections to the stadium would now also be improved. Special shuttle buses were arranged from the S-Bahn stations Leninallee and  Stalinallee, as well as from Antonplatz.

The stadium was gradually expanded during the 1960s. The capacity was 10,000 spectators at the start of the 1965-66 season.  The northern end towards the ice hockey arena, which was still open, was closed with a relatively flat earth embankment, except for the entrance, in the autumn of 1965. The capacity of the stadium thus increased to 12,000 spectators. The capacity was then further expanded to 14,000 spectators in 1968. The stadium had a total capacty of 14,000 spectators at the start of the 1969-70 sesaon, of which 5,000 were seated and 9,000 standing. The clubhouse of BFC Dynamo, the "BFC-Casino", was then opened in Dynamo-Sportforum in August 1969.

The team drew average attendances between 3,000 and 6,000 spectators in the DDR-Oberliga at the Dynamo-Stadion im Sportforum in the 1960s. The highlights were matches against local rivals ASK Vorvärts Berlin, as well as matches against the various top teams during the period, such as SC Empor Rostock, SC Motor Jena and SC Leipzig. In the late 1960s, the matches against local rival 1. FC Union Berlin drew the largest crowds. SC Dynamo Berlin drew 10,000 spectators to its match against SC Empor Rostock in on 25 March 1962, 9,000 spectators to its match against SC Motor Jena on 9 August 1964 and 10,000 spectators to its match against SC Leipzig on 18 September 1965. BFC Dynamo then drew 12,000 spectators to its match against FC Vorwärts Berlin on 26 February 1966 and a whole 13,500 spectators to its match against 1. FC Union Berlin on 3 May 1969.

BFC Dynamo began playing occasional matches that required floodlights at the larger Friedrich-Ludwig-Jahn-Sportpark in Prenzlauer Berg from November 1968. The Friedrich-Ludwig-Jahn-Sportpark was the home ground of FC Vorwärts Berlin at the time. However, the stadium became vacant when FC Vorwärts Berlin was relocated to Frankfurt an der Oder on 31 August 1971. BFC Dynamo played its home matches in the 1971–72 European Cup Winners' Cup and two home matches in the 1971-72 DDR-Oberliga at Friedrich-Ludwig-Jahn-Sportpark during the 1971–72 season. However, more matches at the stadium were not possible after the summer of 1972, as the Friedrich-Ludwig-Jahn-Sportpark was then undergoing extensive renovation for the upcoming 10th World Festival of Youth and Students. 

BFC Dynamo finished the 1971-72 DDR-Oberliga as runners-up and qualified for the 1972-73 UEFA Cup. However, neither the Friedrich-Ludwig-Jahn-Sportpark nor the Walter-Ulbricht-Stadion were available for the upcoming UEFA Cup matches. Both were undergoing extensive renovation for the 10th World Festival of Youth and Students. Instead, the Dynamo-Stadion im Sportforum underwent a complete transformation in just five weeks between the end of July 1972 and September 1972. The flat terraces on the side opposite the main stand and on the two curved ends were substantially raised, the exit in the curved end towards the Weißenseer Weg was closed and the old office building at the main stand was demolished. A new 500-seat grandstand and a more spacious 35-metre office building were built at the main stand. Bleechers made of steel pipes were also build on the embankment at the main stand. All these measures increased the capacity to 20,000 spectators, of which 7,500 were seated. A total of 6,000 cubic meters of soil was moved for the transformation of the stadium. The current grandstand and office building at the main stand dates from this time.

BFC Dynamo played all four home matches in the 1972-73 UEFA Cup at the Dynamo-Stadion im Sportforum. The match against Liverpool F.C. in the Round of 16 on 29 November 1972  was attended by 20,000 spectators. The attendance is still a record attendance for the stadium. BFC Dynamo then remained at the Dynamo-Stadion im Sportforum for a couple more seasons. The surroundings around Dynamo-Sportform had now changed dramatically. The ruling Socialist Unity Party (SED) had decided on an housing construction program at the 8th Party Congress in 1971. The construction of the huge residential area Fennpfuhl, which was the first new large building project of its kind, started in the immediate vicinity of the Dynamo-Sportforum at the end of 1972. The Dynamo-Sportforum was soon surrounded by ten-storey prefabricated buildings. Thousands of people now lived in the vinicity of the stadium. 

The number of spectators for BFC Dynamo at the Dynamo-Stadion im Sportforum increased in the 1970s. BFC Dynamo drew 14,000 spectators to its match against 1. FC Union Berlin on 26 December 1971, 15,000 spectators to its match against 1. FC Union Berlin on 30 September 1972 and 15,000 spectators to its match against SG Dynamo Dresden on 19 May 1973.  An average of 12,000 people attended the last six matches of BFC Dynamo at the stadium in the second half of the 1973-74 season. A whole 19,000 spectators watched the match between BFC Dynamo and 1. FC Magdeburg at the Dynamo-Stadion im Sportforum on 8 March 1975.

BFC Dynamo eventually moved its home matches to the Friedrich-Ludwig-Jahn-Sportpark for the 1975-65 season, due to upcoming repair work at the Dynamo-Stadion im Sportforum.  The move was meant to be temporary, but eventually became permanent. The repair work continued also during the 1976-77 season. The Dynamo-Stadion im Sportforum would rarely be used for larger matches from then. The stadium would mainly be used by the reserve team BFC Dynamo II. BFC Dynamo II had played in the second tier DDR-Liga since the 1968-69 season. The team was transferred to the Next Generation Oberliga (de) after the 1975-76 season, but returned to the DDR-Liga in the 1984-85 season. 

The capacity of the Dynamo-Stadion im Sportforum was reduced to 15,000 spectators in 1985.  BFC Dynamo returned to the Dynamo-Stadion im Sportforum for the 1986-87 season, as the Friedrich-Ludwig-Jahn-Sportspark was going to be completely redeveloped during the season for the 750th anniversary of Berlin. The steel pipe bleechers on the embankment at the main stand had long since dissappeared and had not been rebuilt. BFC Dynamo played its 1986-87 European Cup matches against Örgryte IS and Brøndby IF at the stadium. The match against Örgryte IS in th First round on 1 October 1986 was attended by 15,000 spectators at the Dynamo-Stadion im Sportforum. BFC Dynamo then returned to the Friedrich-Ludwig-Jahn-Sportpark for the 1987-88 season.

The contemporary stadium (1990–present) 
BFC Dynamo was renamed FC Berlin on 19 February 1990. FC Berlin played its home matches in the 1990 Intertoto Cup and its first four home matches in the 1990-91 NOFV-Oberliga at the Stadion im Sportforum. FC Berlin also played its match against SC Freiburg in the first round of the 1991-92 DFB-Pokal 27 July 1991 at the stadium. However, the team would remain at the Friedrich-Ludwig-Jahn-Sportpark in the early 1990s. But after two unsuccessful attempts to win promotion to 2. Bundesliga, FC Berlin eventually returned permanently to the Stadion im Sportforum at the start of the 1992-93 season. The team would play in the Sportforum Hohenschönhasen for many seasons to come. The Friedrich-Ludwig-Jahn-Sportpark would then rarely be used by the club in the remaining seasons of the 1990s.

The capacity of the Stadion im Sportforum was reduced to about 12,000 spectators in 1992. The team drew just a couple of hundred spectators on average per match Stadion im Sportforum in the 1990s. The highlights were the matches against 1. FC Union Berlin. FC Berlin drew 2,338 spectators to its match against 1. FC Union Berlin on 24 September 1994 and 2,170 spectators to its match against 1. FC Union Berlin 21 October 1995. FC Berlin under Club President Volkmar Wanski announced plans in April 1998 to buy and modernize the stadium. The plans included the construction of  a new covered grandstand and a floodlight system. However, the plans eventually failed due to lack of funds. 

The team saw slightly rising attendance figures at the Stadion im Sportforum at the end of the 1990s. Active supporters of BFC Dynamo were traditionally found at the north curved end, popularly known as the Nordwall stand. BFC Dynamo drew 4,220 spectators to its match against 1. FC Union Berlin on 23 November 1999 and then a whole 8,258 spectators to its match against 1. FC Magdeburg in the play-offs for the Regionalliga Nord on 27 May 2001. The average attendance for BFC Dynamo in the successful 2000-01 season at the Stadion im Sportforum was the highest since 1990-91 season. However, BFC Dynamo suffered a financial crash after the 2000-01 season. Insolvency proceedings were opened against the club on 1 November 2001.

Supporters of BFC Dynamo installed new bucket seats on the main stand and built a new clubhouse next to the main stand in 2002-2003. The bucket seats had been left over from the demolition of the swimming stadium in the Sportforum Hohenschönhausen. The Stadion im Sportforum was then equipped wih a 25-metre player tunnel and plexiglass-clad coaching benches in November 2004. BFC Dynamo under Club President Mario Weinkauf announced plans in April 2006 to build a new modern stadium for 10,000–15,000 spectators in the Sportforum Hohenschönhausen. However, these plans did not materialize either. 

BFC Dynamo drew 6,647 spectators to the derby against 1. FC Union Berlin at the Stadion im Sportforum on 13 May 2006. The match was aborted in the second half, when supporters of BFC Dynomo invaded the pitch to storm the away section. As a result of the riots, the stadium was closed for matches in the NOFV-Oberliga Nord at the end of the 2005–06 season. BFC Dynamo thus temporarily had to move to the Friedrich-Ludwig-Jahn-Sportpark. The Stadion in Sportforum was then refurbised during the first half of the 2006–07 season to increase safety. The stadium was not allowed to open until certain requirements from to NOFV had been met. The refurbisment would include a new fence. BFC Dynamo returned to the Stadion im Sportforum in the match against SV Germania Schöneiche on 11 November 2006. The main stand was now secured by a modern fence, but the side opposite the main stand still remained closed.

BFC Dynamo won promotion to the Regionalliga Nordost at the end of the 2013-14 season. The team moved permanently to the Friedrich-Ludwig-Jahn-Sportpark for the 2014–15 season, due to increased media and spectator interest following its promotion. The 2014-15 Regionalliga Nordost meant matches against well-known opponents such as 1. FC Magdeburg and FC Carl Zeiss Jena. The more central location of the Friedrich-Ludwig-Jahn-Sportpark was seen by the club as an opportunity  to attract more spectators. However, BFC Dynamo continued to play occasional minor matches at the Stadion im Sportforum, such as minor matches in the Berlin Cup and friendly matches. BFC Dynamo then returned to play two home matches in the Regionalliga Nordost at the Stadion im Sportforum at the end of the 2018–19 season, due to safety issues at the Friedrich-Ludwig-Jahn-Sportpark. The deteriorating state of the floodlights at the Friedrich-Ludwig-Jahn-Sportpark, had resulted in a temporary closure of the stadium. The move to the Stadion im Sportforum was greeted by some supporters of BFC Dynamo as a move to the true home of the club.

BFC Dynamo remained at the Friedrich-Ludwig-Jahn-Sportpark for another season. The large stadium in the Friedrich-Ludwig-Jahn-Sportpark was then planned to be demolished in the autumn of 2020 for a complete redevlopment. However, the demolition was eventually postponed and the operating permit for the stadium was extended until 31 December 2020. BFC Dynamo could therefore continue to play at the Friedrich-Ludwig-Jahn-Sportpark during the first half of the 2020-21 season. The 2020-21 Regionalliga Nordost was eventually suspended due to the COVID-19 pandemic. BFC Dynamo finally officially announced on 21 March 2021 that the club was going to move back to the Sportforum Hohenschönhausen for the next season.

The Stadion im Sportforum was equipped with a floodlight system in April 2021. The floodlight system installed was the mobile floodlight system that had previously been used at the Friedrich-Ludwig-Jahn-Sportpark as a replacement for the old floodlight system that had been shut down due to its poor structural and technical condition. The mobile floodlight system was no longer needed at the Friedrich-Ludwig-Jahn-Sportpark at the time, as the operating permit for the large stadium had expired. A floodlight system was needed in order for the Stadion im Sportform to meet the requirements from the German Football Association (DFB) for matches in the Regionalliga Nordost.
  
The Stadion im Sportforum has a capacity of around 12,000. The stadium has a seating area on the main stand. The stadium has a seating capacity of around 2,000 seats, of which 400 are roofed. The stands on the opposite side of the main stand and at the two curved ends are standing areas. The terraces on the stand opposite the main stand and at the two curved ends are filled with gravel and equipped with crush barriers. The stadium has an old manual scoreboard above the curved end towards the Weißenseer Weg. BFC Dynamo organized a work effort in the summer of 2021 to get the stadium in shape for the 2021-22 season. Supporters gathered and cleared sections of the old stadium from weeds. Members of the interest group IG BFC'er also restored the iconic manual scoreboard in time for the first home match of 2021-22 Regionalliga Nordost.

BFC Dynamo played its first home match at the Stadion im Sportforum in 2021-22 Regionalliga Nordost against FC Energie Cottbus on 28 July 2021. The match was attended by 2,000 spectators. BFC Dynamo then played its match against VfB Stuttgart in the first round of the 2021-22 DFB-Pokal at the Stadion im Sportforum on 7 August 2021. It was the first match in the DFB-Pokal at the Stadion im Sportforum since FC Berlin played SC Freiburg at the stadium in the 1991-92 DFB-Pokal on 27 July 1991. The stadium was initially only allowed to admit 2,000 spectators for the match, due to the COVID-19 pandemic. However, the day before the match, BFC Dynamo was allowed to sell an additional 1,000 tickets. The match was eventually attended by 2,631 spectators. 

The attendance for BFC Dynamo at the Stadion im Sportforum in the 2021-22 Regionalliga Nordost was almost tripled compared to the last comparable league season before the COVID-19 pandemic. The match between BFC Dynamo and FC Carl Zeiss Jena on  10 April 2022 was attended by 3,219 spectators. BFC Dynamo had great success in the 2021-22 Regionalliga Nordost and reached the play-offs for the 3. Liga. The first match of the play-offs was played at the Stadion im Sportforum. The stadium was allowed to admit 5,000 spectators for the match. 4,420 spectators watched the first match of the play-offs for the 3.Liga between BFC Dynamo and VfB Oldenburg at the Stadion im Sportforum on 28 May 2022.

The future of the football stadium
The Stadion im Sportforum does not meet the requirements of the German Football Association (DFB) for play in the 3. Liga. Among other things, the stadium lacks enough seats, under-soil heating and a sufficiently powerful floodlight system.

The Sportforum Hohenschönhausen is planned for a complete redevelopment, which will be carried out in several stages. However, the current football stadium is not included in the plan.  The redeveloped Sportforum Hohenschönhausen will be organized around a central facility called "Forum Park". The Forum Park will be located exactly where the current football stadium is now located. The current stadium is thus planned to be demolished. Also the current club house would have to make way for the Forum Park.  However, a new, much smaller football stadium is planned to be built on the edge of the sports complex, towards the Konrad-Wolf-Straße. The new smaller stadium was originally planned to hold only 1,000-1,500 spectators.

The Sportforum Hohenschönhausen is considered the spiritual home of BFC Dynamo. The sports complex is the location of the club offices and the clubhouse, which serves as a meeting point for supporters and parents. More than 20 youth teams of BFC Dynamo train regularly at the sports complex. The Stadion im Sportforum stands as the center of  club life. Supporters of BFC Dynamo started a petition in February 2022 for the Stadion im Sportforum to be included in the plans for the redevelopment of the Sportforum Hohenschönhausen and for the preservation of the stadium as the center of the sports complex. The petition reached 8,000 signatures by March 2022. 

BFC Dynamo stood at first place in the 2021-22 Regionalliga Nordost during the second half of the season and promotion to the 3. Liga was a possibility. The question arose where the team would play its matches in the event of a promotion to the 3. Liga. Discussions began with the Senate of Berlin about whether the Stadion im Sportforum could be adapted to 3. Liga requirements. However, the Senate administration announced that there will not be a 3. Liga stadium in Lichtenberg. BFC Dynamo initially received some support from the The Left faction in the bourought of Lichtenberg for a 3. Liga stadium in Lichtenberg. However, The Left emphasized that the Sportforum Hohehschönhausen was a matter for the state of Berlin.

Members of the District council in Lichenberg also asked the Senate of Berlin whether and how the Stadion im Sportforum Sportforum Berlin could be adapted to 3. Liga requirements, so that BFC Dynamo could represent Hohenschönhausen and the city of Berlin in the 3. Liga. The club eventually received support from CDU politician Martin Pätzold, who represents Lichtenberg in the Berlin House of Representatives. Pätzold raised the question of a 3. Liga stadium in Sportforum Hohenschönhausen in the Berlin House of Representatives.
The CDU in Lichtenberg also started a survey to ask whether respondents were in favor of BFC Dynamo getting a 3. Liga stadium in Sportforum Hohenschöhausen. 

BFC Dynamo eventuallt failed in the 2021-22 promotion play-offs for the 3. Liga, but the question of the possibility for the team to continue playing its home matches in the Sportforum Hohenschönhausen is still relevant. The supporters of BFC Dynamo regularly displays a banner saying "Sportforum stays". The club has recently received support from  CDU politician Kai Wegner, who was the opposition leader in the state of Berlin. Wegner has visited the club in the Sportforum Hohenschönhauser, together with Martin Pätzold. Pätzold arranged round table talks about the future of the football stadium at the end August 2022. The Sports policy spokesman for the parties SPD, CDU, the Greens and FDP and the State Secretary for Sport, Nicola Böcker-Giannini participted.

The round table talks did not bring any results for the club. The governing coalition of the SPD, the Greens and The Left wanted to proceed with the current plan for the redevelopment. However, the capacity of the new football stadium, which is planned on the edge of the sports complex, will now be somewhere between 3,000 and 4,000 spectators. However, this capacity is only sufficient for play in the Regionalliga Nordost. BFC Dynamo calculates that it would cost around 10 million Euros to adapt the Stadion im Sportforum to the 3. Liga requirements. The club is prepared to cover nearly 1 million Euros itself. 

A repeat election was held in Berlin on 12 February 2023. Kai Wegner was the top-candidate of the CDU in the election. The CDU eventually won the election and became the biggest party in the state of Berlin for the first time since 1999.

Dynamo-Sporthalle
The Dynamo-Sporthalle is an indoor sports hall with a capacity of 2,000 to 4,000 spectators located on the Weißenseer Weg. The sports hall was built from 1955 and 1958. It was inaugurated in presence of SED First Secretary Walter Ulbricht, SV Dynamo President Erich Mielke and sprinter Christa Stubnick, among others, on 25 January 1958. It measures 47 meters in width, 65 meters in length and 15 meters in height inside, and thus allows several sports such as athletics, handball, boxing, judo, basketball and gymnastics.

The Dynamo-Sporthalle was also used for congresses and political mass meetings during the East German era, such as the first Women's congress of the Democratic Women's League of Germany (DFD) on 25 June 1964. The Dynamo-Sporthalle was also the location for the special  party congresses of the Socialist Unity Party (SED) on 8-9 and 16–17 December 1989, when the party decided to rename itself SED-PDS.

The Dynamo-Sporthalle is still in operation and is used for various smaller events.

Sporthotel and Congress center
The Sporthotel and Congress center  was built to serve the athletes training at the Sportforum and to complement the Sportforum. The facility contained a hotel with 200 beds, a congress center and a restaurant. The Sporthotel and Congress center is located at the south-western end of the Sportforum (in the corner between Weißenseer Weg and Konrad-Wolf-Straße).

The Dynamo-Sporthotel was built from 1960 to 1962 as a hotel in three storeys with an attached restaurant. The facility was significantly expanded in the late 1970s with a congress center in two to three storeys. 
The Sporthotel and Congress center was made a showcase complex for East German sports. It was used by athletes such as Franziska van Almsick of SC Dynamo Berlin and Claudia Pechstein, but became vacant in the 1990s and fell into disrepair. The site is currently awaiting  redevelopment and the remains of the Sporthotel and Congress center will be demolished. A new hotel is planned to be built on the site, as of 2020.

Gallery

See also 
SV Dynamo
SC Dynamo Berlin

Notes

References
 DESG

External links

 Sportforum Berlin – City of Berlin 

Indoor arenas in Germany
Speed skating venues in Germany
Football venues in Berlin
Football venues in East Germany
Athletics (track and field) venues in East Germany
Berliner FC Dynamo
SC Dynamo Berlin
SV Dynamo
Sports venues in Berlin
History of sport in East Germany
Indoor speed skating venues
1970 establishments in East Germany
1986 establishments in East Germany